Thrombosis prevention or thromboprophylaxis is medical treatment to prevent the development of thrombosis (blood clots inside blood vessels) in those considered at risk for developing thrombosis. Some people are at a higher risk for the formation of blood clots than others, such as those with cancer undergoing a surgical procedure. Prevention measures or interventions are usually begun after surgery as the associated immobility will increase a person's risk.

Blood thinners are used to prevent clots, these blood thinners have different effectiveness and safety profiles. A 2018 systematic review found 20 studies that included 9771 people with cancer. The evidence did not identify any difference between the effects of different blood thinners on death, developing a clot, or bleeding. A 2021 review found that low molecular weight heparin (LMWH) was superior to unfractionated heparin in the initial treatment of venous thromboembolism for people with cancer.

There are medication-based interventions and non-medication-based interventions. The risk of developing blood clots can be lowered by life style modifications, the discontinuation of oral contraceptives, and weight loss. In those at high risk both interventions are often used. The treatments to prevent the formation of blood clots is balanced against the risk of bleeding.

One of the goals of blood clot prevention is to limit venous stasis as this is a significant risk factor for forming blood clots in the deep veins of the legs. Venous stasis can occur during the long periods of not moving. Thrombosis prevention is also recommended during air travel. Thrombosis prophylaxis is effective in preventing the formation of blood clots, their lodging in the veins, and their developing into thromboemboli that can travel through the circulatory system to cause blockage and subsequent tissue death in other organs. Clarence Crafoord is credited with the first use of thrombosis prophylaxis in the 1930s.

Pathophysiology of blood clot prevention
The development of blood clots can be interrupted and prevented by the use of medication, changing risk factors and other interventions. Some risk factors can be modified. These would be losing weight, increasing exercise and the cessation of oral contraceptives. Moving during periods of travel is a modifiable behavior. Preventing blood clots includes the use of medications that interrupt the complex clotting cascade and changing the proteins that are needed for clotting. Antiplatelet drugs also have an effect in preventing the formation of clots.

Medical treatments
Thrombosis prophylaxis is not only used for the prevention of deep vein thrombosis, but can be initiated for the prevention of the formation of blood clots in other organs and circumstances unrelated to deep vein thrombosis:

 cerebral complications
 abortion
 ectopic pregnancy
 molar pregnancy
 pregnancy
 childbirth and the puerperium
 coronary
 portal vein thrombosis
 intracranial, nonpyogenic
 intraspinal, nonpyogenic
 mesenteric
 pulmonary

Epidemiology of developing blood clots
The risk of developing deep vein thrombosis, or pulmonary embolism is different than the total risk of the formation of blood clots. This is due to the observation that not all blood clots form in the lower legs. Most hospitalized medical patients have at least 1 risk factor for thrombosis that progresses to thromboembolism and this risk persists weeks after discharge. Those who remain undiagnosed and not treated prophylactically have a 26% chance of developing a fatal embolism. Another 26% develop another embolism. Between 5% and 10% of all in hospital deaths are due to pulmonary embolism (as a consequence of thrombosis). Estimates of the incidence of pulmonary embolism in the US is 0.1% persons/year. Hospital admissions in the US for pulmonary embolism are 200,000 to 300,000 yearly. Thrombosis that develops into DVT will affect 900,000 people and kill up to 100,000 in the US. On average 28,726 hospitalized adults aged 18 and older with a VTE blood clot diagnosis die each year. Risk of thrombosis is related to hospitalization. In 2005 the UK the Parliamentary Health Select Committee determined the annual rate of death due to thrombosis was 25,000 with at least 50% being hospital-acquired.

The type of surgery performed prior to the formation of blood clots influences the risk.
Without prophylactic interventions, the calculated incidence of clot formation in the lower leg veins after surgery is:
 22% for neurosurgery
 26% for abdominal surgery
 45% for 60% in orthopedic surgery
 14% for gynecologic surgery

As the population of the US ages, the development of blood clots is becoming more common.

General risks and indications for blood clot prevention

Some risk factors for developing blood clots are considered higher that others. One scoring system analyzes the probability for clot formation by assigning a point value system to significant risk factors. The benefit of treating those who are at low risk of developing blood clots may not outweigh the higher risks of significant bleeding.

{| class="wikitable"
|+ Probability and risk estimation for developing blood clots
! Major risk (=1 point) !! Minor risk (=2 points)
|-
| Cancer || Family history of deep vein thrombosis
|-
| Immobility || Hospitalization withinthe past 6 months
|-
| Calf swelling || superficial vein dilation
|-
| Recent major surgery || redness of area
|-
| Edema or swelling of only leg ||Recent traumato leg
|-
| Tenderness inthe calf and/or thigh ||
|-
|}

Risk for subsequent blood clots
Developing blood clots is more probable after the first episode. Risk assessment and intervention for those with one or more episodes of deep vein thrombosis or blood clots in the veins utilizes the Well's test. It has been inconsistently modified by a number of publishers with the results listed below:

Well's and modified Well's risk scoring

Adapted for the emergency department

Scoring:
 less than 2 points – low risk (3%)
 2–6 points moderate risk (17%)
 > 6 points high risk (75%)

General interventions
The Centers for Disease Control and Prevention have issued general guidelines describing the interventions that can be taken to reduce the risk of the formation of blood clots:

Interventions during travel
Seat-edge pressure from the seat on an airplane on the popliteal area may contribute to vessel wall damage as well as venous stasis. Coagulation activation may result from an interaction between cabin conditions (such as hypobaric hypoxia) and individual risk factors for the formation of blood clots. Studies of the pathophysiologic mechanisms for the increased risk of Venous thrombosis embolism or VTE after long-distance travel have not produced consistent results, but venous stasis appears to play a major role; other factors specific to air travel may increase coagulation activation, particularly in passengers with individual risk factors for VTE.

Interventions for those hospitalized

Compression devices
Mechanical compression devices are used for prevention of thrombosis and are beneficial enough to be used by themselves with patients at low to moderate risk. The use of fitted intermittent pneumatic compression devices before, during and after procedures is used in inpatient settings. It consists of an air pump and inflatable auxiliary compartments that sequentially inflates and deflated to provide an external 'pump' that returns venous blood toward the heart. The use of intermittent pneumatic compression is common. These devices are also placed on a surgical patient in the operating room (the intra-surgical period) and remain on the person while recovering from the surgery.

The application of antiembolism stockings can be used to prevent thrombosis. The correct use and properly fitted graded compression stockings can reduce the rate of thrombosis by 50%. Contraindications for the use of antiembolism stockings include the presence of advanced peripheral and obstructive arterial disease, septic phlebitis, heart failure, open wounds, dermatitis and peripheral neuropathy. Differences between the use of thigh-high compression stockings and shorter types to prevent blood clots exist, but remain inconsistent.

Assessment
There has been some success in preventing blood clots by an early risk assessment upon admission to the hospital, which is a strategy recognized by the Centers for Disease Control and Prevention. Hospitals that have participated in this effort to reduce the incidence of thrombosis found that rates of DVT decreased in some instances. Some hospitals developed a mandatory assessment quantifying the risk for developing blood clots and a plan of care developed from the results. The person's risk for developing blood clots is entered into their record, 'following' them through their treatment regime. If the hospital stay exceeds three days, the person will be reassessed for risk. Clinicians are then able to apply protocols for prevention based upon best clinical practices.

Interventions to treat immobility

Immobility is a significant risk factor in the development of thrombosis. Immediate post-surgical interventions, such as out of bed orders (OOB), are typically ordered by the physician to prevent thrombosis. These orders, typically delegated to a nurse, but may include the participation of a physical therapist and others trained to perform the intervention, are to perform range of motion (ROM) activities that include: muscle contractions of the lower legs for those who are very weak, moving the feet, wiggling the toes, bending the knees, raise and lower the legs. In addition, changes in positioning prevents immobility and shifts areas of venous stasis. If the person is too weak to perform these preventative activities, hospital personnel will perform these movements independently. Exercise of the lower extremities is a post-operative method of prophylaxis. Nursing personnel will often perform range of motion exercises and encourage frequent moving of the legs, feet, and ankles. Frequent positioning changes and adequate fluid intake. After a surgical procedure, ambulation as soon as possible is prophylactic in preventing the formation of blood clots.

Early ambulation also prevents venous stasis and physicians order OOB activities on the same day of surgery. This is accomplished in increments. The progression of increasing mobility proceeds by: raising the head of the bed, sitting up in bed, moving to the edge of the bed, dangling the legs off the bed and then ambulating to a close chair.

Patient education and compliance reduces the risk of developing blood clots. These exercises and use of equipment and follow up by clinicians reduces the risk of developing blood clots.

Note that if a blood clot has already formed in the deep veins of the leg, bedrest is usually prescribed and the treatment to prevent bloods with physical intervention is contraindicated.

Medication

Anticoagulants and antiplatelets
Thromboprophylaxis, such as anticoagulants or perioperative heparin, is effective for hospitalized patients at risk for VTE. Additional risk factors such as obesity, disease, malignancies, long surgeries, and immobility may influence the prescribed dosage. Anticoagulant medications may prevent the formation of blood clots in people who are at high risk for their development. Treating blood clots that have already formed is managed by the use of anti-hemolytic ("clot busters"). Despite its effectiveness, the use of thromboprophylaxis remains under-utilized, though alerts (computer or human) in hospitals are associated with increased prescription and reductions in symptomatic VTE. The list below describes some of the more common medications used to prevent blood clots. Note that generally since blood clotting is inhibited, a side effect typically is increased bleeding, though it can be reversed by administering a medication that stops the bleeding or by discontinuation of the medication itself. Anti-coagulant administration is often given before the start of the operation. Medications that inhibit blood clot formation include:

Heparins
Adding heparin to the use of compression stockings may prevent thrombosis for those of higher risk.

{|  class="wikitable sortable"
|-
|+ Heparin Prophylaxis
! style="background: #0FC;" |name !!style="background: #0FC;"|action !!style="background: #0FC;"|structure !! style="background: #0FC;"|references
|-
|  ||  || ||
|-
| style="background: #FF9;" |Low-molecular weight heparin(example: Reviparin) ||  ||  ||
|-
|}
The discontinuation of contraceptives also prevents blood clots.

Herbal interactions
The therapeutic effects of warfarin may be decreased by valerian. Anticoagulants can be affected by chamomile. Dong quai, garlic, ginger, Ginkgo biloba, bilberry  and feverfew can increase bleeding time. These same herbal supplements taken with warfarin increased prothrombin time.

Dietary interactions
By containing significant content of vitamin K, some foods act as antagonists to antiplatelet and anticoagulant medications; these include green leafy vegetables, like spinach, legumes, and broccoli.

Contraindications
Preventing blood clots with medication is not considered safe in the following circumstances:

 uncooperative patient
 recent childbirth
 gastrointestinal bleeding
 reproductive system bleeding
 genitourinary systembleeding
 hemorrhagic blood dyscrasias
 peptic ulcers
 alcoholism
 infection
 eye surgery
 brain surgery
 spinal cord surgery
 recent cerebrovascular hemorrhage

Research

An international registry and risk assessment calculator is being used to centralize data on post-surgical venous thrombosis and its prevention. Hospitals are implementing a multi-disciplinary approach to prevent of blood clots. This includes adequate assessment of the risks, follow up on missed doses of medication and instituting a 'patient-centered' approach endorsed by the Joint Commission. Recommendations regarding the prevention of blood clots vary widely between clinicians and treatment facilities. Research continues to clarify these discrepancies. The metabolic state of hypercoagulability (the tendency to form blood clots) tests are being developed. These include the evaluation of the thrombin–antithrombin complexes (TAT), low levels of the anticoagulants ATIII and protein C, but these tests are not yet widely available.

References 
 Using Wikipedia for Research

Preventive medicine
Diseases of veins, lymphatic vessels and lymph nodes
Coagulopathies
Hematology
Antiplatelet drugs
Aspirin
Blood
Chemical substances for emergency medicine
Nutrition
Salicylates
Tissues (biology)